Compsomyces is a genus of fungi in the family Laboulbeniaceae. The genus contain 7 species.

References

External links
Compsomyces at Index Fungorum

Laboulbeniaceae
Laboulbeniales genera